Oleksiy Rodevych (born 11 August 1988 in Kolomyia, Ivano-Frankivsk Oblast, Ukrainian SSR) is a professional Ukrainian football midfielder. He is the product of the Karpaty Lviv Youth School System.

External links
Website Karpaty Profile
Profile on EUFO
Profile on Football Squads
 

1988 births
Living people
People from Kolomyia
Ukrainian footballers
FC Karpaty Lviv players
MFC Mykolaiv players
FC Rukh Lviv players
Ukrainian First League players
Ukrainian Second League players
Ukrainian Amateur Football Championship players

Association football midfielders